Fred Payne may refer to:

Fred Payne (baseball) (1880–1954), Major League Baseball player for the Detroit Tigers and Chicago White Sox
Frederick Payne of the Payne Brothers pantomime act
Frederick G. Payne (1904–1978), U.S. politician
Frederick Huff Payne (1876–1960), United States Assistant Secretary of War
Fred Payne (footballer) (born 1927), Australian rules footballer
Fred Payne (actor), British actor in Nuts and Wine
Frederick Payne (umpire) (1908–1992), South African cricket umpire
Frederick R. Payne Jr. (1911–2015), American Marine Corps general

See also
Frederick William Payn (1873–1908), British amateur tennis player
Freda Payne (born 1942), American singer and actress